Samruk-Kazyna, officially known as the National Welfare Fund "Samruk-Kazyna", is a sovereign wealth fund and joint stock company in Kazakhstan which owns, either in whole or in part, a number of major companies in the country. This includes the national rail and postal service, the state oil and gas company KazMunayGas, the state uranium company Kazatomprom, Air Astana, and others. The state is the sole shareholder of the fund.

History

It was created in October 2008 with the merger of two funds, "Samruk" and "Kazyna", by decree of the president of Kazakhstan, Nursultan Nazarbayev.
The current chairman of the board of directors is Almasadam Satkaliev. 
Previously, then-Prime Minister Bakhytzhan Sagintayev served as chairman and Umirzak Shukeyev as Chief Executive Officer and Chairman. Independent directors include Sir Richard Harry Evans, Alper Akdeniz, Wilhelm Bender.

The President of the Republic Nursultan Nazarbayev initiated the unification of national companies into a single holding under the control of the state.
The idea to unite all national companies into a single holding under state control was born by Nursultan Nazarbayev after his visit to Singapore in autumn 2003.
In 2003, the President of Kazakhstan met with Mr. Lee Kuan Yew and the Management Board of the TEMASEC, national investment Fund, which manages part of the state assets of Singapore. Nursultan Nazarbayev highly appreciated Lee Kuan Yew's activities in the field of state government and economy development and took into account the experience of the "Singapore economic miracle" in carrying out Kazakhstan's economic reforms.

After studying the experience of 13 world state holdings, it was concluded that one of the resources of Kazakhstan in increasing the long-term value and capitalization of national companies is to improve corporate governance.
In August 2006 by the decree of the President of the Republic of Kazakhstan was founded JSC "Kazakhstan Holding of the State assets management "Samruk", an investment holding, whose mission was to improve the national welfare of the Republic of Kazakhstan and ensure the long-term sustainability of future generations.
First Board of Directors and Management Board of JSC "Kazakhstan holding on state assets management "Samruk" was approved by the President of Kazakhstan and consists of highly qualified top managers. Currently, Alikhan Smailov has been appointed Chairman of the Board of Directors. The first Chairman of the Board of Directors was the Head of the President Administration, Mr. Zhaksybekov A. R., later this position was taken by Sir Richard Evans. The first Chairman of the Management Board was Mynbayev S. M., Deputy Chairman of the Management Board was Mr. Kulibayev T. A. The current chairman is Akhmetzhan Yessimov, a former deputy prime minister of Kazakhstan and the current father-in-law of Galimzhan Yessenov . Yessimov has been criticised for allowing Samruk to deposit about $350 million in cash with his son-in-law Yessenov's bank, ATF. The Holding also attracted foreign specialists from Germany, Mr. Wokurka Ulf and from Russia, Mr. Stepanko Michael.

At the first stage, only 5 national companies were included in the Samruk Holding, some of which are natural monopolies.
 JSC "national company "Kazakhstan Railways"
 JSC "national company "KazMunaiGas";
 JSC "Kazakhstan company on management of energy networks of "KEGOC"
 JSC "Kazpost"
 JSC "Kazakhtelecom"

At the second stage, 17 national companies operating in the mining, energy sector, related to the sea and air transportation of goods and passenger transportation, generation and distribution of electricity, metallurgy and pipeline infrastructure were included in the Holding "Samruk". In 2006, Samruk holding united 22 national companies, which accounted for 24% of Kazakhstan's GDP.
The state holding focused its activities on the following main issues:
· coordination of positions of various ministries and departments to determine long-term goals and objectives of state companies;
· the selection, motivation, evaluation of managers of state-owned companies, development of their skills; planning, budgeting and approval investment of state-owned companies; monitoring the activities of state-owned companies and the adoption of corrective measures;
· advising the Government  corporate Finance.

In 2009 Samruk merge with Investment Holding Kazayna.

The fund is a member of the International Forum of Sovereign Wealth Funds and are signed up to the 24 Santiago Principles which are a voluntary standard of best practice endorsed by the members for the management of the Sovereign Wealth Funds.

Organizations owned by Samruk-Kazyna
The following is a partial list of organizations partly or wholly owned by the Samruk-Kazyna fund. The percentage of shares controlled by the fund is indicated in brackets. 576 subsidiaries and associated companies are included in the Fund's group of companies (as of June 30, 2014).

 "KazMunayGas" NC (90%)
 "Kazakhstan Electricity Grid Operating Company" JSC (90%)
 "Kazakhtelecom" JSC (51%)
 "Kazpost" JSC  (100%)
 "Kazakhstan Engineering" JSC  (56,35%)
 "Pavlodar Airport"  (100%)
 "Aktobe Airport" (100%)
 "Air Astana" JSC (51%)
 "Samruk-Kazyna Contract" LLP (100%)
 "Samruk-Kazyna Invest" LLP (100%)
 "Samruk-Energy" JSC (100%)
 "Real Estate Fund Samruk-Kazyna" JSC (100%)
 "Kazakhstan Temir Zholy" JSC (100%)
 "Kazatomprom" JSC NC (75%)
 "United Chemical Company" LLP (100%)
 National Mining Company "Tau-Ken Samruk" JSC (100%)
 "Alliance bank" JSC (51%)
 "Shalkiya Zinc Ltd" JSC  (100%)
"KOREM" JSC (100%)
 KGF IM  (100%)
 "Atyrau Airport" JSC (100%)
 "Karagandagiproshaht & K" LLP (90%)
 "Samruk-Kazyna Finance" LLP (100%)

Privatization
Samruk-Kazyna implements a privatization drive to foreign investors to further develop a market based economy.

See also 

 WikiBilim Public Foundation

Notes

External links
 Official site

Companies based in Astana
Companies of Kazakhstan
Government-owned companies of Kazakhstan
Economy of Kazakhstan
Foundations based in Kazakhstan
Sovereign wealth funds